The "358" missile is a loitering, surface to air missile, allegedly developed by Iran. The majority of "358" missiles were captured in seizures of illegal arms shipments to the Houthi forces as part of the UNSC arms embargo (UNSC Security Resolution 2216) imposed on Yemen since 2015. The "358" missile has never been seen in Iranian service.

History
The first known examples of the "358" missile was identified in a seizure on November 25, 2019 by the US Navy in the Gulf of Aden. The vessel, the Al-Raheeb was intercepted by the USS Forrest Sherman with two "358" missiles among the illegal munitions found. A further intercept on February 9, 2020 on the dhow Al Qanas 1 by the USS Normandy uncovered a further 3 missiles among the items seized.

A fully assembled "358" missile was found on October, 21 2021 by the 52nd Brigade of Iraq's Popular Mobilization Forces (PMF) in the vicinity of the Tuz Khormatu military airfield, in a hamlet called Albu Sabah in Iraq as a possible warning or threat to US forces in the area.

A further shipment of the "358" missiles were captured by HMS Montrose, a Type 23 frigate of the Royal Navy on January 28, 2022.

Design
According to the UN Panel of Experts, it was determined that a significant amount of components were commercially available and acquired off the shelf through a series of shell companies. The main engine was a Titan AMT gas turbine by AMT Netherlands, while an Inertial Sensor Module MTi-100 was identified to be from Xsense Technologies. The missile is observed to be using an optical proximity fuse.

Concept of Operations
The "358" missile has a solid fuel booster stage for launch. Once launched, the booster will detach and the remainder of the flight will be taken over by the gas turbine engine. Given the performance of the gas turbine, sweep wing design and fuel capacity, the missile would have subsonic performance with long range and endurance. It is suspected that the missile will loiter in a simple flight pattern (e.g lazy eight) to identify and attack targets of opportunity.

References 

Surface-to-air missiles of Iran
Guided missiles of Iran